John Kingston  (fl. 1406) was an English politician.

Kingston was a Member of Parliament for Devizes, Wiltshire in 1406.

References

Year of birth missing
Year of death missing
14th-century births
15th-century deaths
English MPs 1406
People from Devizes